Kei Cheong (Traditional Chinese: 乾忠) is a Macau football club, which plays in Macao. They play in the Macau's first division, the Campeonato da 1ª Divisão do Futebol.

Achievements
Macau Championship: 0

Notes

Football clubs in Macau